Sally Dawes (born 27 June 1973) is an English former racing cyclist.

Cycling career
Dawes was a silver medalist at the Junior Points Race World Championships in Moscow in 1991, and again at the Junior Road World Championships in Colorado Springs in 1991.

She represented England in the 3,000 metres individual pursuit, at the 1990 Commonwealth Games in Auckland, New Zealand.

Personal life
She was for a period known as Sally Timmis, following a brief marriage to Adrian Timmis.

Palmarès 

1989
2nd Junior points race, UCI Track World Championships

1990
3rd British National Road Race Championships

1991
2nd UCI Junior Road World Championships
8th Team time trial, UCI Road World Championships (with Julie Hill, Louise Jones, & Mandy Jones)

1993
2nd overall, National Road Race Series

1994
2nd Pursuit, British National Track Championships

References

External links 

1973 births
Living people
English female cyclists
Sportspeople from Leicestershire
Cyclists at the 1990 Commonwealth Games
Commonwealth Games competitors for England